"Tyttö sinä olet meritähti" is the debut single by Finnish Hip-Hop, Rap group Yön Polte. It was released on 2 January 2012 as a digital download in Finland. The song has peaked to number 7 on the Finnish Singles Chart.

Track listing

Chart performance

Release history

References

External links
Official website
Yön Polte on Facebook

2012 debut singles
Yön Polte songs
2012 songs